The men's 400 metre freestyle event at the 1972 Olympic Games took place September 1. This swimming event used freestyle swimming, which means that the method of the stroke is not regulated (unlike backstroke, breaststroke, and butterfly events). Nearly all swimmers use the front crawl or a variant of that stroke. Because an Olympic size swimming pool is 50 metres long, this race consisted of eight lengths of the pool.

Rick DeMont of the United States originally won the gold medal in 4:00.26. Following the race, the International Olympic Committee (IOC) stripped DeMont of his gold medal after his post-race urinalysis tested positive for traces of the banned substance ephedrine contained in his prescription asthma medication, Marax. The positive test following the 400-meter freestyle final also deprived him of a chance at multiple medals, as he was not permitted to swim in any other events at the 1972 Olympics, including the 1,500-meter freestyle for which he was the then-current world record-holder. Before the Olympics, DeMont had properly declared his asthma medications on his medical disclosure forms, but the U.S. Olympic Committee (USOC) had not cleared them with the IOC's medical committee. The United States Olympic Committee (USOC) has recognized his gold medal performance in the 1972 Summer Olympics in 2001, but only the IOC has the power to restore his rankings, and it has not done so.

Medalists

Results

Heats
Heat 1

Heat 2

Heat 3

Heat 4

Heat 5

Heat 6

Final

Key: DSQ = Disqualified, OR = Olympic record

References

Men's freestyle 400 metre
Men's events at the 1972 Summer Olympics